AppletViewer is a standalone command-line program from Sun to run Java applets. Appletviewer is generally used by developers for testing their applets before deploying them to a website.

As a Java developer, it is a preferred option for running Java applets that do not involve the use of a web browser. Even though the applet viewer logically takes the place of a web browser, it functions very differently from a web browser. The applet viewer operates on HTML documents, but all it looks for is embedded applet tags; any other HTML code in the document is ignored. Each time the applet viewer encounters an applet tag in an HTML document, it launches a separate applet viewer window containing the respective applet. 
The only drawback to using the applet viewer is that it will not show how an applet will run within the confines of a real web setting. Because the applet viewer ignores all HTML codes except applet tags, it does not even attempt to display any other information contained in the HTML document.

An Applet viewer creates an environment that mimics the look and feel of a stand-alone program with no interaction with a web browser, even though it does involve a browser to run an applet. 

Appletviewer is included with Sun's JDK package, but not with Sun's JRE package. The Java development kit GCJ also has its own version of appletviewer, called "gappletviewer".

External links 
 The Java Website
 [download.jsp Java SE Downloads], JDK download page
 [docs/tooldocs/ JDK Development Tools], includes detailed documentation of appletviewer and other Java tools

Java platform software